Ephraim Dodds (7 September 1915 – 23 February 2007) was a Scottish professional footballer. He played in the 1936 FA Cup Final, and, at the time of his death was the oldest surviving player to have played in a final at Wembley Stadium.

Club career
Dodds was born in Grangemouth. His father died when he was two years old. His family moved to Durham in 1927 after his mother remarried. Four years later, at the age of 16, he began his career at First Division Huddersfield Town as a centre forward.

In 1934, after just two years with the Terriers, and via a short spell with Lincoln City, he took a free transfer to Second Division Sheffield United. Dodds later became the Blades''' leading scorer for four successive seasons, netting a total of 130 goals in just 203 appearances.

His debut came on 15 September 1934, against Burnley but despite playing and scoring regularly in the following months, the club was unconvinced that he was yet of first-team quality. The club made an enquiry into the return of former player Jimmy Dunne, who found himself out of favour at Arsenal after he had been sold, but this came to nothing due to a cartilage injury. Dodds secured his position by scoring four goals in the next game, a 6–1 victory against Southampton on 16 February 1935. His prolific goalscoring helped the club reach the 1936 FA Cup Final, in which he almost scored, hitting the crossbar with a header. It was said by Ernest Jackson that he would have scored nine times out of ten from such a position and Dodds himself claimed that he had been pushed in the back by Wilf Copping. United ultimately lost the final to Arsenal, 1–0, thanks to a goal by Ted Drake.

Big, strong and quick, Dodds worked hard at his game and was duly rewarded. His 100th league goal came in his 154th appearance, against Tottenham Hotspur on 12 September 1938. His last appearance for the Blades came against city rivals Sheffield Wednesday on 4 March 1939.

Dodds moved to First Division Blackpool in March 1939 for £10,000, citing family reasons as the source of his transfer request. At the time it was the second highest transfer fee, to the record fee of £14,000 paid to Wolverhampton Wanderers by Arsenal for Bryn Jones. Dodds agreed terms of £6 a week plus a £2 bonus for every first-team appearance.

On his move to Blackpool Dodds later said, "It was a lovely sunny day and after the sooty streets of Sheffield I remember thinking it was like coming to paradise." He made his Seasiders debut on 11 March 1939, in a defeat at Charlton Athletic, scoring Blackpool's only goal. He went on to score four in a home win over Middlesbrough and quickly became a favourite. The Second World War intervened, and the Football League programme was abandoned. Dodds joined the Royal Air Force, and was stationed in Blackpool as a PT instructor sergeant. He continued to play for Blackpool, with most of his goals in the war years coming in regional competitions. In the North Regional League, he scored 65 goals in 1941–2, and then 47 goals in 1942–3. In 1943, Blackpool beat Sheffield Wednesday over two legs to win the League Cup North, and then defeated League Cup South champions Arsenal 4–2, mainly thanks to right winger Stanley Matthews. He scored eight goals against Stockport County in 1941, and seven goals against Tranmere Rovers in 1942, including a hat-trick in just  minutes. For over 60 years it stood as the fastest hat-trick in the Football League, before James Hayter bettered it by ten seconds in 2004.
 
During World War II, Dodds played guest matches for Manchester United, Fulham and West Ham United. He also made one guest appearance for Clapton Orient, against Queens Park Rangers on 14 October 1944. Orient lost 0-3 before 3,000 spectators.

In seven years at Bloomfield Road, Dodds scored well over 200 goals, including 66 in 1941-2 alone.

He signed for Irish side Shamrock Rovers in August 1946 and scored twice on his debut at Milltown on 8 September . In total he played five games, two in the Dublin City Cup and three in the League of Ireland Shield scoring four goals before being sold to Everton in November 1946 for £7,750 . Everton were in desperate need of a centre forward after Dixie Dean retired and Tommy Lawton moved to Chelsea. Dodds scored 36 goals in 55 league appearances for the Toffees in 1946–8. He was sold to his former club Lincoln City in October 1948 for £6,000, where he ended his playing career.

International career
Dodds made all eight of his international appearances for Scotland during the wartime period, and thus they are unofficial. On 18 April 1942, he netted a hat-trick in a 5–4 win over England at Hampden Park in front of a crowd of 91,000. Bill Shankly hit Scotland's winning goal. Dodds scored 8 goals in his 6 games versus England.

Post-retirement
After retiring as a player, he tried to recruit players to go to Bogotá, to play in a new league outside FIFA control. He was banned by the Football Association in July 1950 for bringing the game into disrepute, but was later cleared. He decided against taking up positions in football management, and concentrated on business interests in Blackpool, where he said of the town in 1989, "I have lived here ever since [his move from Sheffield in 1939] and love the place."

On 22 February 1989 Dodds was given a certificate for his two-and-a-half-minute hat-trick against Tranmere Rovers in 1942, which had for many years been listed in the Guinness Book of Records. "I have been listed in the Guinness Book of Records for years but I never thought about a certificate until I read about a woman receiving one for being the oldest golfer to hit a hole in one. A friend wrote to the GBR asking if I could have a certificate and they sent one to me."

Dodds' wife died in 2005, and he died two years later, on 24 February 2007 at Blackpool's Victoria Hospital. At the time of his death he was the oldest living FA Cup finalist, aged 91.

Blackpool F.C. Hall of Fame
Dodds was inducted into the Hall of Fame at Bloomfield Road, when it was officially opened by former Blackpool player Jimmy Armfield in April 2006. Organised by the Blackpool Supporters Association, Blackpool fans around the world voted on their all-time heroes. Five players from each decade are inducted; Dodds is in the 'pre-1950s'.

Career statistics

Sheffield United

See also 
 List of men's footballers with 500 or more goals

References

Further reading

External links
Jock Dodds in the Blackpool Supporters Association Hall of Fame
 Obituary, The Independent, 7 March 2007
Obituary, The Guardian, 9 May 2007
Obituary, The Guardian, 13 May 2007

1915 births
2007 deaths
Scottish footballers
Association football forwards
Huddersfield Town A.F.C. players
Sheffield United F.C. players
Blackpool F.C. players
Everton F.C. players
Lincoln City F.C. players
Shamrock Rovers F.C. players
League of Ireland players
People from Grangemouth
West Ham United F.C. wartime guest players
Scotland wartime international footballers
Royal Air Force personnel of World War II
Footballers from Falkirk (council area)
Clapton Orient F.C. wartime guest players
Manchester United F.C. wartime guest players
Fulham F.C. wartime guest players
Anglo-Scots
Royal Air Force airmen
FA Cup Final players